The athletics competition at the West African Games was held from 27 August – 3 September 1977 at the National Stadium, Lagos in Lagos, Nigeria. A total 34 events were contested, 21 for men and 13 for women

Medal summary

Men

Women

References

Medallists
West African Games. GBR Athletics. Retrieved 2019-09-12.

West African Games
International athletics competitions hosted by Nigeria
West African Games
West African Games
West African Games
West African Games